Gomolko is a surname. Notable people with the surname include: 

Nikolay Gomolko (born 1938), Russian rower
Tatyana Gomolko (born 1940), Russian rower, wife of Nikolay